RSC Chemical Solutions is a privately held automotive products company based in Charlotte, North Carolina, with a manufacturing headquarters in Indian Trail, North Carolina. It is one of the nation's top automotive products producers and the second-largest producer of ancillary radiator products in the United States and Canada.

The firm is currently based in a  facility in Indian Trail. It has a total employment of approximately 250 people. Its current President and CEO is Mike Guggenheimer.

The company was founded as Radiator Specialty Company in 1924 by I.D. Blumenthal, who began marketing a product called Solder Seal to fix leaky car radiators.  He was joined by his younger brother Herman Blumenthal in 1933.

RSC's makes Gunk, a line of degreasers,  Gunk, which has been described as an "instrument shampoo," was developed by Gunk Chicago Co.  Originally, RSC was a regional distributor for Gunk.

RSC also produces Liquid Wrench, a line of lubricants marketed as "application-specific" competitors to WD-40.  The company adopted the name RSC Chemical Solutions in 2010.

The Blumenthal family have been responsible for significant philanthropic efforts in North Carolina, including substantial funding for the North Carolina Blumenthal Performing Arts Center in Charlotte.

References

External links
RSC Chemical Solutions company website
RSC Bio Chemical RSC Bio Chemical company website
LIQUID WRENCH Liquid Wrench Brand website
GUNK GUNK Brand website
MOTOR MEDIC Motor Medic Brand website
TITESEAL TITESEAL Brand website

Automotive companies of the United States
Companies based in North Carolina
Chemical companies established in 1924
1924 establishments in North Carolina